Sny aniołów is the second studio album of Polish progressive rock group Quidam, released 1998. It was released simultaneously in Poland by Rock-Serwis and in the rest of the world by Musea Records. The latter version was retitled Angels' Dreams and featured re-recorded vocals in English. The album introduced Jacek Zasada as new flute player, replacing Ewa Smarzynska.

Track listing 
 "Przebudzenie" (Derkowska, Florek, Jermakow, Meller, Scholl, Zasada) – 1:42
 "Moje Anioly" (Derkowska, Florek, Jermakow, Meller, Scholl) – 4:21
 "Morelowy Sen" (Derkowska, Florek, Jermakow, Meller, Scholl) – 5:17
 "Wesola" (Derkowska, Florek, Jermakow, Meller, Scholl) – 6:59
 "Beznogi Maly Ptak" (Derkowska, Florek, Jermakow, Meller, Scholl, Wilkowski) – 4:06
 "Lza" (Derkowska, Florek, Jermakow, Meller, Scholl, Wilkowski) – 4:56
 "Pod Powieka" (Derkowska, Florek, Jermakow, Meller, Scholl) – 13:57
 "Przebudzenie (Swit Nadziei)" (Derkowska, Florek, Jermakow, Meller, Scholl) – 4:07	
 "Jest Taki Samotny Dom (There Is Such A Lonesome House)" (Cugowski, Lipko, Sikorski) – 5:31

The track listing of the English version:
 "Awakening" – 1:42
 "Angels Of Mine" – 4:21
 "An Apple Dream" – 5:17
 "Cheerful" – 6:59
 "Little Bird With No Legs" – 4:06
 "One Small Tear" – 4:56
 "Behind My Eyes" – 13:57
 "Awakening (Dawn Of Hope)" – 4:07	
 "There Is Such A Lonesome House" – 5:31

Personnel 

 Emilia Derkowska – vocal, backing vocals, cello
 Zbyszek Florek – piano, keyboards
 Maciej Meller – guitars
 Jacek Zasada – flutes
 Radek Scholl – bass guitar
 Rafał Jermakow – drums, percussions

Guest musician
 Witold Ekielski – oboe in "Beznogi mały ptak", "Łza", "Pod Powieką"
 Michał Wojciechowski – bassoon in "Beznogi mały ptak"
 Małgorzata Lachowicz – violin in "Jest taki samotny dom"
 Karolina Chwistek – violin in "Jest taki samotny dom"
 Magdalena Wróbel – viola in "Jest taki samotny dom"
 Dominika Miecznikowska – cello in "Jest taki samotny dom"

References

1998 albums
Quidam (band) albums